Solomon Mensah (born 6 May 1992) is a Ghanaian footballer who plays as a midfielder for Kuwaiti club Al-Fahaheel.

Club career
Born in Accra, Mensah has played for Tema Youth, Bechem United, and Fairpoint. Solomon Mensah signed for Ghana Premier League club Bechem United at the beginning of the 2015 season.

Mensah joined Lebanese club Shabab Sahel in September 2018 on a one-year-deal. At the end in January 2020, Mensah moved to Egyptian club Aswan SC in a deal until June 2022. He moved to Iraqi club Naft Maysan in 2021.

In January 2022, he moved to Petrojet. On 29 June 2022 he joined Kuwaiti club Al-Fahaheel.

Honours

Club 
Shabab Sahel
 Lebanese Elite Cup: 2019

References

External links
 

1992 births
Living people
Ghana international footballers
Ghanaian footballers
Ghanaian expatriate footballers
Association football midfielders
Ghana Premier League players
Lebanese Premier League players
Egyptian Premier League players
Shabab Al Sahel FC players
Bechem United FC players
Tema Youth players
Aswan SC players
Footballers from Accra
Ghanaian expatriate sportspeople in Lebanon
Ghanaian expatriate sportspeople in Egypt
Expatriate footballers in Lebanon
Expatriate footballers in Egypt
Naft Maysan FC players
Al-Fahaheel FC players
Petrojet SC players
Egyptian Second Division players
Iraqi Premier League players
Kuwait Premier League players
Ghanaian expatriate sportspeople in Kuwait
Ghanaian expatriate sportspeople in Iraq
Expatriate footballers in Iraq
Expatriate footballers in Kuwait